Jeanette Anna MacDonald (June 18, 1903 – January 14, 1965) was an American singer and actress best remembered for her musical films of the 1930s with Maurice Chevalier (The Love Parade, Love Me Tonight, The Merry Widow and One Hour With You) and Nelson Eddy (Naughty Marietta, Rose-Marie, and Maytime). During the 1930s and 1940s she starred in 29 feature films, four nominated for Best Picture Oscars (The Love Parade, One Hour with You, Naughty Marietta and San Francisco), and recorded extensively, earning three gold records. She later appeared in opera, concerts, radio, and television. MacDonald was one of the most influential sopranos of the 20th century, introducing opera to film-going audiences and inspiring a generation of singers.

Early years
MacDonald was born Jeannette Anna McDonald on June 18, 1903, at her family's Philadelphia home at 5123 Arch Street. She was the youngest of the three daughters of Anna May (née Wright) and Daniel McDonald, a factory foreman and a salesman for a contracting household building company, respectively, and the younger sister of character actress Blossom Rock (born Edith McDonald), who was most famous as "Grandmama" on the 1960s TV series The Addams Family. She was of Scottish, English, and Dutch descent. The extra N in her given name was later dropped for simplicity's sake, and A added to her surname to emphasize her Scottish heritage. She began dancing lessons with local dance instructor Caroline Littlefield, mother of American ballerina/choreographer Catherine Littlefield, when very young, performing in juvenile operas, recitals, and shows staged by Littlefield around the city, including at the Academy of Music.  She later took lessons with Al White and began touring in his kiddie shows, heading his "Six Little Song Birds" in Philadelphia at the age of nine.

Acting career

Broadway

In November 1919, MacDonald joined her older sister Blossom in New York. She took singing lessons with Wassili Leps and landed a job in the chorus of Ned Wayburn's The Demi-Tasse Revue, a musical entertainment presented between films at the Capitol Theatre on Broadway. In 1920, she appeared in two musicals: Jerome Kern's Night Boat as a chorus replacement, and Irene on the road as the second female lead; future film star Irene Dunne played the title role during part of the tour, and Helen Shipman played the title role during the other part of the tour. In 1921, MacDonald played in Tangerine as one of the "Six Wives." In 1922, she was a featured singer in the Greenwich Village revue Fantastic Fricassee, for which good press notices brought her a role in The Magic Ring the next year. MacDonald played the second female lead in this long-running musical which starred Mitzi Hajos. In 1925, MacDonald again had the second female lead opposite Queenie Smith in Tip Toes, a George Gershwin hit show.

The following year, 1926, found MacDonald still in a second female lead in Bubblin' Over, a musical version of Brewster's Millions. She finally landed a starring role in Yes, Yes, Yvette in 1927. Planned as a sequel to producer H.H. Frazee's No, No, Nanette, the show toured extensively, but failed to please the critics when it arrived on Broadway. MacDonald also played the lead in her next two plays: Sunny Days in 1928 in her first show for the producers Lee and J.J. Shubert, for which she received rave reviews; and Angela (1928), which the critics panned. Her last play was Boom Boom in 1929, with her name above the title; the cast included young Archie Leach, who would later become Cary Grant.

While MacDonald was appearing in Angela, film star Richard Dix spotted her and had her screen-tested for his film Nothing but the Truth. The Shuberts, however, would not let her out of her contract to appear in the film, which starred Dix and Helen Kane (the "Boop-boop-a-doop girl"). In 1929, famed film director Ernst Lubitsch was looking through old screen tests of Broadway performers and spotted MacDonald. He cast her as the leading lady in The Love Parade, his first sound film, which starred Maurice Chevalier.

Film career

Paramount, controversial move to Fox Film Corporation
In the first rush of sound films during 1929 and 1930, MacDonald starred in six films—the first four for Paramount Studios. Her first, The Love Parade (1929), directed by Ernst Lubitsch and co-starring Maurice Chevalier, was a landmark of early sound films, and received a Best Picture nomination. MacDonald's first recordings for RCA Victor were two hits from the score: "Dream Lover" and "March of the Grenadiers." The Vagabond King (1930) was a lavish two-strip Technicolor film version of Rudolf Friml's hit 1925 operetta. Broadway star Dennis King reprised his role as 15th-century French poet François Villon, and MacDonald was Princess Katherine. She sang "Some Day" and "Only a Rose." The UCLA Film and Television Archive owns the only known color print of this production.

1930 was an extremely busy year for Paramount and MacDonald. Paramount on Parade was an all-star revue, similar to other mammoth sound revues produced by major studios to introduce their formerly silent stars to the public. MacDonald's footage singing a duet of "Come Back to Sorrento" with Nino Martini was cut from the release print due to copyright reasons with Universal Studios, which had recently acquired the copyright to the song for an upcoming movie, King of Jazz. Let's Go Native was a desert-island comedy directed by Leo McCarey, co-starring the likes of Jack Oakie and Kay Francis. Monte Carlo became another highly regarded Lubitsch classic, with British musical star Jack Buchanan as a count who disguises himself as a hairdresser in order to woo a scatterbrained countess (MacDonald). MacDonald introduced "Beyond the Blue Horizon," which she recorded three times during her career, including performing it for the Hollywood Victory Committee film Follow the Boys.

In hopes of producing her own films, MacDonald went to United Artists to make The Lottery Bride in 1930. Despite music by Rudolf Friml, the film was not successful. MacDonald next signed a three-picture deal with the Fox Film Corporation, a controversial move in Hollywood; every other studio was far superior in the eyes of many, from their budgets to the fantastical entertainment of their films. Oh, for a Man! (1930) was more successful; MacDonald portrayed a temperamental opera singer who sings Wagner's "Liebestod" and falls for an Irish burglar played by Reginald Denny. In 1931, Don't Bet on Women was a non-musical drawing-room comedy in which a playboy (Edmund Lowe) bets his happily married friend (Roland Young) that he can seduce his friend's wife (MacDonald). Annabelle's Affairs (1931) was a farce, with MacDonald as a sophisticated New York playgirl who does not recognize her own miner husband, played by Victor McLaglen, when he turns up five years later. Although highly praised by reviewers at the time, only one reel of this film survives.

MacDonald took a break from Hollywood in 1931 to embark on a European concert tour, performing at the Empire Theater in Paris (Mistinguett and Morris Gest were said to have been in the crowd) and at London's Dominion Theatre, and was invited to dinner parties with British Prime Minister Ramsay MacDonald and French newspaper critics. She returned to Paramount the following year for two films with Chevalier. One Hour with You in 1932 was directed by both George Cukor and Ernst Lubitsch, and simultaneously filmed in French with the same stars, but a French supporting cast. Currently, no surviving print of Une Heure près de toi (One Hour With You) is known. Rouben Mamoulian directed Love Me Tonight (1932), considered by many film critics and writers to be the perfect film musical. Starring Chevalier as a humble tailor in love with a princess played by MacDonald, much of the story is told in sung dialogue. Richard Rodgers and Lorenz Hart wrote the original score, which included the standards "Mimi," "Lover," and "Isn't It Romantic?"

MGM, Nelson Eddy partnership

In 1933, MacDonald left again for Europe, and while there signed with Metro-Goldwyn-Mayer. Her first MGM film was The Cat and the Fiddle (1934), based on the Jerome Kern Broadway hit. Her co-star was Ramón Novarro. The plot about unmarried lovers shacking up just barely slipped through the new Production Code guidelines that took effect July 1, 1934. Despite a Technicolor finale—the first use of the new three-color Technicolor process other than Disney cartoons—the film was not a huge success. It lost $142,000. In The Merry Widow (1934), director Ernst Lubitsch reunited Maurice Chevalier and MacDonald in a lavish version of the classic 1905 Franz Lehár operetta. The film was highly regarded by critics and operetta lovers in major U.S. cities and Europe, but failed to generate much income outside urban areas, losing $113,000. It had a huge budget of $1.6 million, partially because it was filmed simultaneously in French as La Veuve Joyeuse, with a French supporting cast and some minor plot changes.

Naughty Marietta (1935), directed by W. S. Van Dyke, was MacDonald's first film in which she teamed with newcomer baritone Nelson Eddy. Victor Herbert's 1910 score, with songs like "Ah! Sweet Mystery of Life," "I'm Falling in Love with Someone," "'Neath the Southern Moon," "Tramp, Tramp, Tramp," and "Italian Street Song," enjoyed renewed popularity. The film won an Oscar for sound recording, and received an Oscar nomination for Best Picture. It was voted one of the Ten Best Pictures of 1935 by the New York film critics, was awarded the Photoplay Gold Medal Award as Best Picture of 1935 (beating out Mutiny on the Bounty, which won the Oscar), and in 2004 was selected to the National Film Registry. MacDonald earned gold records for "Ah! Sweet Mystery of Life" and "Italian Street Song." The following year, MacDonald starred in two of the highest-grossing films of that year. In Rose-Marie, MacDonald played a haughty opera diva who learns her young brother (pre-fame James Stewart) has killed a Mountie and is hiding in the northern woods; Eddy is the Mountie sent to capture him. Nelson Eddy and she sang Rudolf Friml's "Indian Love Call" to each other in the Canadian wilderness (actually filmed at Lake Tahoe). Eddy's definitive portrayal of the steadfast Mountie became a popular icon. When the Canadian Mounties temporarily retired their distinctive hat in 1970, photos of Eddy in his Rose Marie uniform appeared in thousands of U.S. newspapers. San Francisco (1936) was also directed by W.S. Van Dyke. In this tale of the 1906 San Francisco earthquake, MacDonald played a hopeful opera singer opposite Clark Gable as the extra-virile proprietor of a Barbary Coast gambling joint, and Spencer Tracy as his boyhood chum who has become a priest and gives the moral messages.

In the summer of 1936, filming began on Maytime, co-starring Nelson Eddy, Frank Morgan, and Paul Lukas, produced by Irving Thalberg. After Thalberg's untimely death in September, production was shut down and the half-finished film scrapped. A new script was filmed with a different storyline and supporting actors (including John Barrymore, whose relationship with MacDonald was strained due to his alcoholism). The 'second' Maytime (1937), was the top-grossing film worldwide of the year, and is regarded as one of the best film musicals of the 1930s. "Will You Remember" by Sigmund Romberg brought MacDonald another gold record.

The Firefly (1937) was MacDonald's first solo-starring film at MGM with her name alone above the title. Rudolf Friml's 1912 stage score was borrowed, and a new song, "The Donkey Serenade," added, adapted from Friml's "Chanson" piano piece. With real-life Americans rushing to fight in the ongoing revolution in Spain, this historical vehicle was constructed around a previous revolution in Napoleonic times. MacDonald's co-star was tenor Allan Jones, who she demanded get the same treatment as she would, such as an equal number of close-ups. The MacDonald/Eddy team had split after MacDonald's engagement and marriage to Gene Raymond, but neither of their solo films grossed as much as the team films, and an unimpressed Mayer used this to point out why Jones could not replace Eddy in the next project. The Girl of the Golden West (1938) was the result, but the two stars had little screen time together, and the main song, "Obey Your Heart," was never sung as a duet. The film featured an original score by Sigmund Romberg, and reused the popular David Belasco stage plot (also employed by opera composer Giacomo Puccini for La fanciulla del West).

Mayer had promised MacDonald the studio's first Technicolor feature, and he delivered with Sweethearts (1938), co-starring Eddy. In contrast to the previous film, the co-stars were relaxed onscreen and singing frequently together. The film integrated Victor Herbert's 1913 stage score into a modern backstage story scripted by Dorothy Parker and Alan Campbell. MacDonald and Eddy played a husband-and-wife Broadway musical-comedy team who are offered a Hollywood contract. Sweethearts won the Photoplay Gold Medal Award as Best Picture of the Year. Mayer dropped plans for the team to co-star in Let Freedom Ring, a vehicle first announced for them in 1935. Only Eddy starred, whereas MacDonald and Lew Ayres co-starred in Broadway Serenade (1939) as a contemporary musical couple who clash when her career flourishes while his founders. MacDonald's performance was subdued, and choreographer Busby Berkeley, just hired away from Warner Bros., was called upon to add an over-the-top finale in an effort to improve the film. Broadway Serenade did not entice audiences in a lot of major cities, with Variety claiming that New York, Chicago, and Los Angeles' cinema attendances were "sad," "slow,"and "sour."

Following Broadway Serenade, and not coincidentally right after Nelson Eddy's surprise elopement with Ann Franklin, MacDonald left Hollywood on a concert tour and refused to renew her MGM contract. Months later she summoned her manager Bob Ritchie from London to help her renegotiate. After initially insisting that she wanted to film Smilin' Through with James Stewart and Robert Taylor, MacDonald finally relented and agreed to film New Moon (1940) with Eddy, which proved to be one of MacDonald's more popular films. Composer Sigmund Romberg's 1927 Broadway hit provided the plot and the songs: "Lover, Come Back to Me," "One Kiss," and "Wanting You," plus Eddy's version of "Stout Hearted Men." This was followed by Bitter Sweet (1940), a Technicolor film version of Noël Coward's 1929 stage operetta, which Coward loathed, writing in his diary about how "vulgar" he found it. Smilin' Through (1941) was MacDonald's next Technicolor project, the third adaptation filmed in Hollywood, with Brian Aherne and Gene Raymond. Its theme of reunion with deceased loved ones was enormously popular after the devastation of World War I, and MGM reasoned that it should resonate with audiences during World War II, but it failed to make a profit. MacDonald played a dual role—Moonyean, a Victorian girl accidentally murdered by a jealous lover, and Kathleen, her niece, who falls in love with the son of the murderer.

I Married an Angel (1942), was adapted from the Rodgers & Hart stage musical about an angel who loses her wings on her wedding night. The script by Anita Loos suffered serious censorship cuts during filming that made the result less successful. MacDonald sang "Spring Is Here" and the title song. It was the final film made by the team of MacDonald and Eddy. After a falling-out with Mayer, Eddy bought out his MGM contract (with one film left to make) and went to Universal, where he signed a million-dollar, two-picture deal. MacDonald remained for one last film, Cairo (1942), a cheaply budgeted spy comedy co-starring Robert Young as a reporter and Ethel Waters as a maid, whom MacDonald personally requested. Within one year, beginning in 1942, L.B. Mayer released his four highest-paid actresses from their MGM contracts; Norma Shearer, Joan Crawford, Greta Garbo, and Jeanette MacDonald. Of those four stars, MacDonald was the only one whom Mayer would rehire.

Final roles

After opening the Metropolitan Opera's membership campaign, MacDonald appeared as herself in Follow the Boys (1944), an all-star extravaganza about Hollywood stars entertaining the troops. The more than 40 guest stars included Marlene Dietrich, W.C. Fields, Sophie Tucker, and Orson Welles. MacDonald is shown during a concert singing "Beyond the Blue Horizon," and in a studio-filmed sequence singing "I'll See You in My Dreams" to a blinded soldier. She returned to MGM after five years off the screen for two films. Three Daring Daughters (1948) co-starred José Iturbi as her love interest. MacDonald plays a divorcée whose lively daughters (Jane Powell, Ann E. Todd, and Elinor Donahue) keep trying to get her back with her ex, but she has secretly remarried. The song "The Dickey Bird" made the hit parade. The Sun Comes Up (1949) teamed MacDonald with Lassie in an adaptation of a short story by Marjorie Kinnan Rawlings. MacDonald played a widow who has lost her son, but warms to orphan Claude Jarman Jr. It would prove to be her final film.

She frequently attempted a comeback movie, even financing and paying a screenwriter. One of the possible film reunions with Nelson Eddy was to be made in England, but Eddy pulled out when he learned MacDonald was investing her own funds. Eddy preferred to publicly blame the proposed project as mediocre, when in fact MacDonald was uninsurable due to her heart condition. A reunion with Maurice Chevalier was also considered. Other thwarted projects with Eddy were The Rosary, The Desert Song, and a remake of The Vagabond King, plus two movie treatments written by Eddy for them, Timothy Waits for Love and All Stars Don't Spangle. Offers continued to come in, and in 1962, producer Ross Hunter proposed MacDonald in his 1963 comedy The Thrill of It All, but she declined. 20th Century Fox also toyed with the idea of MacDonald (Irene Dunne was briefly considered) for the part of Mother Abbess in the film version of The Sound of Music. It never moved beyond the discussion stages partly because of MacDonald's failing health.

An annual poll of film exhibitors listed MacDonald as one of the top-10 box-office draws of 1936, and many of her films were among the top-20 moneymakers of the years they were released. In addition, MacDonald was one of the top-10 box-office attractions in Great Britain from 1937 to 1942. During her 39-year career, MacDonald earned two stars on the Hollywood Walk of Fame (for films and recordings) and planted her feet in the wet concrete in front of Grauman's Chinese Theater.

Musical theatre
In the mid-1950s, MacDonald toured in summer-stock productions of Bitter Sweet and The King and I. She opened in Bitter Sweet at the Iroquois Amphitheater, Louisville, Kentucky, on July 19, 1954. Her production of The King and I opened August 20, 1956, at the Starlight Theatre. While performing there, she collapsed. Officially, it was announced as heat prostration, but in fact it was a heart seizure. She began limiting her appearances, and a reprisal of Bitter Sweet in 1959 was her last professional stage appearance.

MacDonald and her husband Gene Raymond toured in Ferenc Molnár's The Guardsman. The production opened at the Erlanger Theater in Buffalo, New York, on January 25, 1951, and played in 23 Northeastern and Midwestern cities until June 2, 1951. Despite less-than-enthusiastic comments from critics, the show played to full houses for virtually every performance. The leading role of "The Actress" was changed to "The Singer" to allow MacDonald to add some songs. While this pleased her fans, the show closed before reaching Broadway.

In the 1950s, talks with respect to a Broadway return occurred. In the 1960s, MacDonald was approached about starring on Broadway in a musical version of Sunset Boulevard. Harold Prince recounts in his autobiography visiting MacDonald at her home in Bel Air to discuss the proposed project. Composer Hugh Martin also wrote a song for the musical, entitled "Wasn't It Romantic?"

MacDonald also made a few nightclub appearances. She sang and danced at The Sands and The Sahara in Las Vegas in 1953, The Coconut Grove in Los Angeles in 1954, and again at The Sahara in 1957, but she never felt entirely comfortable in their smoky atmospheres.

Music career

Concert tours, World War II charity work
Starting in 1931 and continuing through the 1950s, MacDonald engaged in regular concert tours between films. Her first European tour was in 1931, where she sang in both France and England. Her first American concert tour was in 1939, immediately after the completion of Broadway Serenade. MacDonald performed at the Mayo Civic Auditorium in Rochester, Minnesota on April 19, 1939, to open that venue before an audience. She sang several times at the Hollywood Bowl and Carnegie Hall. When America joined World War II in 1941, MacDonald co-founded the Army Emergency Relief and raised funds on concert tours. When she was home in Hollywood, she held an open house at her home on Sunday afternoons for GIs. On one occasion, at the request of Lt. Ronald Reagan, she was singing for a large group of men in San Francisco who were due to ship out to the fierce fighting in the South Pacific. She closed with "The Battle Hymn of the Republic," and 20,000 voices spontaneously joined in. She auctioned off encores for donations and raised almost $100,000 for the troops (over $1.5 million, adjusted for inflation). President Franklin D. Roosevelt, who considered MacDonald and Eddy two of his favorite film stars, awarded her a medal. She also did command performances at the White House for President Dwight D. Eisenhower.

Opera

Unlike Nelson Eddy, who came from opera to film, MacDonald in the 1940s yearned to reinvent herself in opera. She began training for this goal with Lotte Lehmann, one of the leading opera stars of the early 20th century. "When Jeanette MacDonald approached me for coaching lessons," wrote Lehmann, "I was really curious how a glamorous movie star, certainly spoiled by the adoration of a limitless world, would be able to devote herself to another, a higher level of art. I had the surprise of my life. There couldn't have been a more diligent, a more serious, a more pliable person than Jeanette. The lessons which I had started with a kind of suspicious curiosity turned out to be sheer delight for me. She studied Marguerite with me—and lieder. These were the ones which astounded me most. I am quite sure that Jeanette would have developed into a serious and successful lieder singer if time would have allowed it."

MacDonald made her opera debut singing Juliette in Gounod's Roméo et Juliette in Montreal at His Majesty's Theatre (May 8, 1943). She quickly repeated the role in Quebec City (May 12), Ottawa (May 15 and 17), Toronto (May 20 and 22), and Windsor (May 24). Her U.S. debut with the Chicago Opera Company (November 4, 11 and 15, 1944) was in the same role. She also sang Marguerite in Gounod's Faust with the Chicago Opera. In the summer of 1945, she appeared with the Cincinnati Opera as Juliette in two performances of Roméo et Juliette (July 10 and 25) and one as Marguerite in Faust (July 15). That November, she did two more performances of Roméo et Juliette and one of Faust in Chicago. On December 12, 1951, she did one performance of Faust with the Philadelphia Civic Grand Opera Company at the Academy of Music.

Claudia Cassidy, the music critic of the Chicago Tribune wrote, "Her Juliet is breathtakingly beautiful to the eye and dulcet to the ear." The same critic reviewed Faust: "From where I sit at the opera, Jeanette MacDonald has turned out to be one of the welcome surprises of the season ... her Marguerite was better than her Juliet ... beautifully sung with purity of line and tone, a good trill, and a Gallic inflection that understood Gounod's phrasing ... You felt if Faust must sell his soul to the devil, at least this time he got his money's worth."

Radio and television

MacDonald's extensive radio career may have begun on a 1929 radio broadcast of the Publix Hour. She was on the Academy Awards ceremony broadcast in 1931. She hosted her own radio show, Vicks Open House, from September 1937 to March 1938, for which she received $5,000 a week. However, the time demands of doing a weekly live radio show while filming, touring in concerts, and making records proved enormously difficult, and after fainting on-air during one show, she decided not to renew her radio contract with Vicks at the end of the 26-week season. Thereafter, she stuck to guest appearances.

MacDonald appeared in condensed radio versions of many of her films on programs such as Cecil B. DeMille's Lux Radio Theater, often with Nelson Eddy, and the Railroad Hour, which starred Gordon MacRae. These included The Merry Widow, Naughty Marietta, Rose Marie, Maytime, Sweethearts, Bitter Sweet, Smilin' Through, and The Sun Comes Up, plus other operettas and musicals such as Victor Herbert's Mlle Modiste, Irene, The Student Prince, Tonight or Never with Melvyn Douglas, A Song for Clotilda, The Gift of the Magi, and Apple Blossoms. Other radio shows included The Prudential Family Hour, Screen Guild Playhouse, and The Voice of Firestone, which featured the top opera and concert singers of the time. In 1953, MacDonald sang "The Star-Spangled Banner" at the inauguration of President Dwight D. Eisenhower, broadcast on both radio and TV.

MacDonald sang frequently with Nelson Eddy during the mid-1940s on several Lux Radio Theater and The Screen Guild Theater productions of their films together. She also appeared as his guest several times on his various radio shows such as The Electric Hour and The Kraft Music Hall. He was also a surprise guest when she hosted a war-bonds program called Guest Star, and they sang on other World War II victory shows together. The majority of her radio work in the mid to late 1940s was with Eddy. Her 1948 Hollywood Bowl concert was also broadcast over the air, in which she used Eddy's longtime accompanist, Theodore Paxson.

MacDonald appeared on early TV, most frequently as a singing guest star. She sang on The Voice of Firestone on November 13, 1950. On November 12, 1952, she was the subject of Ralph Edwards' This Is Your Life. Her surprise guests included her sisters, a sailor she danced with at the Hollywood Canteen, her former English teacher, her husband and the clergyman who married them, and Nelson Eddy appeared as a voice from her past, singing the song he sang at her wedding; his surprise appearance brought her to tears. Shortly thereafter, she appeared as the mystery guest on the December 21, 1952, episode of What's My Line? After the panelists guessed her identity, she told John Daly she was in New York for the holidays and would have a recital at Carnegie Hall on January 16. On February 2, 1956, MacDonald starred in Prima Donna, a television pilot for her own series, written for her by her husband Gene Raymond. The initial show featured guest stars Leo Durocher and Larraine Day, but it failed to find a slot. In December 1956, MacDonald and Eddy made their first TV appearance as a team on the Lux Video Theatre Holiday Special. In 1957, Eddy and she appeared on Patti Page's program The Big Record, singing several songs. On Playhouse 90 (March 28, 1957), MacDonald played Charley's real aunt to Art Carney's impersonation in "Charley's Aunt."

Personal life

When MacDonald was born, her father quickly doted on her. Although he had hoped for a son who would pursue "an American dream" life that he believed he had failed to live himself, he advised his three daughters to do this instead. MacDonald was the only daughter in the family that had inherited both her father's red hair and blue-green eyes, although she often admired her sisters' beauty, such as Blossom's dimples and her elder sister Elsie's (1893—1970) blonde hair and blue eyes. Elsie could play the piano, and taught toddler MacDonald a variety of popular waltzes and Stephen Foster's compositions. At this time, MacDonald discovered that she was an extrovert who enjoyed socializing with friends and performing for others, admitting that "[I] needed people to watch and applaud me as much as I needed food and drink." At the end of her first performance in the local church as a child, "I paused ever so slightly and then, when I realized they needed prodding, I promptly began clapping my hands and said to the congregation, 'Now everybody's got to clap!'"

MacDonald cited the number thirteen as her lucky number. Her characters always had a name beginning with M, the first letter of her surname and the 13th letter of the English alphabet, a ritual upon which she had insisted. Interestingly, thirteen became a recurring number throughout her life, such as the thirteen-year gap between her overseas tours in Europe; principal photography for The Merry Widow had taken thirteen weeks to film; her first movie, The Love Parade, was the number-one box-office draw for 13 weeks; MacDonald performed opera for the first time for a screen test thirteen years after meeting Newell (who was also on set); the thirteen-year gap between her and sister Blossom's death; and husband Gene Raymond's birthday was August 13.

On sets, MacDonald would never lip-sync, instead singing along to song playbacks during filming, which Lew Ayres discovered when he starred alongside her in Broadway Serenade, whereupon he was supplied with earplugs after the volume nauseated him. 

A recurrent issue throughout MacDonald's career was her health. Her handwritten letter from August, 1929 indicates that MacDonald, age 26, had recently suffered a heart attack. She also suffered from stage fright throughout her life to the point that her therapist told her to imagine that all of the members of the audience were lettuce. Due to her heart condition, she could not carry a pregnancy to term; she had blackouts and fainting spells, became stressed to the point of not being able to eat, and was frequently in and out of hospitals and trying different treatments (one being massage therapy), which only worked for a limited time. A few years before her death, MacDonald became a Religious Scientist. Her illnesses would not allow her to perform early morning filming shoots, much to her colleagues' annoyance.

MacDonald was a Republican, but she mostly avoided commenting on politics. When approached by the House Un-American Activities Committee about whether she had heard any gossip about Communist activity in Hollywood, she replied, "As at any focal point, there are some belligerents, but they are no more numerous than in any other community." Neither she nor Gene Raymond were ever considered or subpoenaed for a HUAC hearing; in a radio interview, MacDonald was quoted as saying, "Let he who is without sin cast the first stone" in response to what her opinion was on the investigations. She fired her manager Charles Wagner for anti-Semitic abuse of her Jewish friend Constance Hope, and declared during the 1940 presidential election, "I sing for Democrats and Republicans, black and white, everyone, and I just can't talk politics."

Relationships
MacDonald met Jack Ohmeis (1901-1967) at a party during her appearance in Tangerine. He was an architecture student at New York University and the son of a successful bottle manufacturer. His family was hesitant about the relationship, assuming that MacDonald was a gold-digger, but accepted her after they met. She and Ohmeis became engaged a year later, but their future plans and aspirations forced them to go their separate ways; the sudden death of MacDonald's father was another factor in the break-up. Unfortunately, the Ohmeis family would lose a lot of their fortune after the Wall Street Crash, so MacDonald loaned money to Jack, and he repaid her as soon as he could, which was as late as the 1950s. MacDonald next dated Irving Stone (1901-1968) from around 1926–28; they met when she was touring in Chicago in The Magic Ring. Stone, who lived in Milwaukee, was the nephew of the founder of the Wisconsin Boston Store, and worked in the family business. Few details were known of Stone's romance with MacDonald until the discovery of hundreds of pages of handwritten love letters she wrote to him that were found in his apartment after his death, which happened three years after her death.

MacDonald eventually dated a Wall Street rep named Robert Ritchie (died 1972), 12 years her senior, who claimed that he was the son of a fallen millionaire. They traveled with MacDonald's family to Hollywood, and he became a press agent for MGM. Rumors circulated that they were engaged and/or secretly married, since Ritchie was by MacDonald's side during her European tour and they lived together—MacDonald even signing her return address as "JAR" (Jeanette Anna Ritchie) and referring to him as her "darling husband." Despite Ritchie's family claiming that he was married to MacDonald but the marriage had been annulled in 1935, he never confirmed the claims. He later relocated to Europe as an MGM representative, becoming responsible for recruiting Greer Garson, Hedy Lamarr, and Luise Rainer.

MacDonald married Gene Raymond in 1937. She met him at a Hollywood party two years earlier at Roszika Dolly's home; MacDonald agreed to a date, as long as it was at her family's dinner table. Despite the strong relationship, Raymond's mother did not like MacDonald, attempting to snub her a few times (such as arranging her son with Janet Gaynor as a plus-one at a charity ball), and did not attend the wedding. The Raymonds lived in a 21-room Mock Tudor mansion named Twin Gables with their pet dogs and their horse White Lady, which Raymond gave to MacDonald as a birthday present; after MacDonald's death, it was briefly owned by John Phillips and Michelle Phillips of The Mamas and Papas. MacDonald often worried about her husband's self-esteem; his acting career was constantly shaky, and RKO Pictures eventually sold out his contract when he had two movies left to make with them in the 1950s. Although she appreciated his support, MacDonald wished that their success was equal.

Raymond was sometimes mistaken for Nelson Eddy by MacDonald's fans and passersby, which MacDonald later admitted that she never liked: "Of course we always laughed it off—sometimes Gene even obliged by signing Nelson's name—but no one will ever know the agonies I suffered on such occasions. More than anything else in the world those days, I wanted to see him receive as much acclaim as I, to spare him these humiliations." When she reunited with Chevalier in 1957, he asked her why she had retired from films, to which she replied, "Because for exactly twenty years I've played my best role, by his [Raymond's] side. And I'm perfectly happy."

Death

MacDonald died at the Houston Methodist Hospital from heart failure on January 14, 1965, with Raymond by her hospital bed. Two years before, she had been assigned Dr. Michael DeBakey, who had recently operated successfully on the Duke of Windsor, in the hope that he could save her. Despite the surgery, MacDonald became ill with pleurisy the week after, and was in Houston Methodist Hospital for over a month. In December 1964, her condition worsened and she was rushed to UCLA Medical Center. DeBakey suggested open-heart surgery, and Raymond brought MacDonald into the hospital January 12. On the afternoon of the 14th, Raymond was at her bedside massaging her feet when she died. He said that their last conversation was when MacDonald said, "I love you," and he replied, "I love you too;" she then sighed deeply, and her head hit the pillow.

The funeral took place on January 18. Along with close family and widower Raymond, it was notably attended by a handful of MacDonald's costars (such as Eddy, Allan Jones, Chevalier, Joe E. Brown, Spencer Tracy, Lloyd Nolan, etc.), representatives of her fan club, former presidents Harry S. Truman and Dwight D. Eisenhower, Senator George Murphy, former vice-president Richard Nixon, future governor & president Ronald Reagan, and Mary Pickford; Dr. Gene Emmet Clark of the Church of Religious Science officiated. Newsreel footage shows Nelson Eddy as the last person to exit the church, with Lauritz Melchior and other celebrities offering him condolences. MacDonald was interred in a pink-marbled crypt at Forest Lawn Memorial Park, Glendale, which reads "Jeanette MacDonald Raymond." Hers is next to Nat King Cole, and George Burns and Gracie Allen.

Honors and commemorations
MacDonald was crowned as the Queen of the Movies in 1939 with Tyrone Power as her king. The ceremony was filmed and presented by Ed Sullivan.

MacDonald was awarded an honorary doctor of music degree from Ithaca College in 1956.

MacDonald was named Philadelphia's Woman of the Year in 1961. Of the award, she said, "It is strange how awards, decorations, doctorates, etc., can be conferred from various parts of the country, and even the world. And yet, the funny satisfaction of being recognized in one's home town seems to be a more gratifying recognition than all."

Posthumous
Shortly after MacDonald's death, surviving classmates from her high school contributed a $150 donation in her name to the Children's Heart Hospital of Philadelphia.

The USC Thornton School of Music built a Jeanette MacDonald Recital Hall in her honor.

A bronze plaque for MacDonald was unveiled in March 1988 on the Philadelphia Music Alliance's Walk of Fame in Raymond's presence.

Controversy

Autobiography
MacDonald began developing an autobiography in the 1950s. She wanted her readers to both be inspired by her career and understand how she had coped with balancing a public and personal life. In one early version she intended to candidly discuss Nelson Eddy but dropped that idea when Eddy feared public fallout. She hired and fired other ghostwriters and wrote a manuscript solo but it was rejected by the publisher for being "too genteel"; MacDonald refused to include many personal details about Eddy and she deleted already typed pages admitting to one single pregnancy that ended in miscarriage. Her last ghost writer, Fredda Dudley Balling, noted that MacDonald was too ill to work more than a couple hours a day, so a final draft was never completed. The unfinished manuscript was published and annotated in 2004.  MacDonald said that publishers wanted her to spice up her story.  She refused to gossip about her colleagues and said she did not live that kind of life.  In the last year of her life, despite declining health, she still was trying to find a publisher.  An early version of the book, written with James Brough, is in the Cinematic Arts Library, Doheny Memorial Library, University of Southern California.

Relationship with Nelson Eddy

Despite public denials from the stars themselves of any personal relationship between Jeanette MacDonald and Nelson Eddy, documentation shows otherwise. In a handwritten 1935 letter by Nelson to "Dearest Jeanette," written on his letterhead, Nelson Eddy writes: "I love you and will always be devoted to you."

In the biography Sweethearts by Sharon Rich, the author presents MacDonald and Eddy as continuing an adulterous affair after their marriages. Rich, who was a close friend of MacDonald's older sister Blossom Rock, also knew Gene Raymond, and documents that the relationship lasted—with a few breaks—until MacDonald's death. Newsreel footage from MacDonald's funeral shows Eddy as the last person exiting the chapel, circled by other celebrities, such as Lauritz Melchior, who offer him condolences.

MacDonald had a reported eight pregnancies by Eddy, the first while they were filming Rose Marie. This was before she had an intimate relationship with Gene Raymond. Raymond was physically unable to father children, and MacDonald alluded to this fact in her unfinished autobiography, writing that she returned from her Hawaii honeymoon with Raymond with the knowledge and accurate admittance that "The MacRaymonds had no children." Nevertheless, MacDonald had additional, later, documented and visible pregnancies while married to Raymond, all of which ended in miscarriage.

Rich's findings also included documentation that Raymond physically and emotionally abused MacDonald, and had affairs as early as their honeymoon when MacDonald allegedly discovered Raymond in bed with Buddy Rogers. Raymond was arrested three times, the first in January 1938, as verified by a court document, and also in England during his army service, for his behavior. Raymond's wedding to MacDonald, orchestrated by Louis B. Mayer, forced MacDonald to become Raymond's "beard," and the 1938 arrest resulted in Mayer blacklisting him in Hollywood for almost two years.

Biographer E. J. Fleming also alleged that Eddy had confronted Raymond for abusing MacDonald, who was visibly pregnant with Eddy's child while filming Sweethearts, which ended with Eddy attacking him and leaving him for dead, though newspapers reported Raymond was recovering from a fall down the stairs.

At that time Mayer adamantly refused to allow MacDonald to annul her marriage and elope.  The situation ended with MacDonald losing her baby at nearly 6 months. The boy was named Daniel Kendrick Eddy, and Nelson buried him (or his ashes) on private property in Ojai, California.

Other co-stars and friends verified the MacDonald/Eddy relationship.

Over the decades, MacDonald and Eddy privately occupied several homes together. In 1938, they had a small Burbank house located at 812 S. Mariposa Street in Burbank. In the 1940s, Nelson leased and remodeled for himself and MacDonald the old cowboy bunkhouse at 1330 Angelo Drive, Beverly Hills. Starting in 1947, they used 710 N. Camden Drive, which had been the home of MacDonald's mother until her death. They also alternately stayed at favorite hotels and homes across the country owned by celebrity friends including Lily Pons and Irene Dunne. In 1963, MacDonald and Raymond moved into two adjoining apartments at the Wilshire Comstock in Westwood, on the 8th floor in the East building. Nelson Eddy had his own apartment on the 7th floor of the West building, and allowed MacDonald to decorate it; they used it as a rendezvous spot until she was too weak to walk the few yards over to his building. (After Eddy's death, his widow Ann learned of the apartment and moved into it.)

Forbidden to marry early on by MGM studio boss Louis B. Mayer, MacDonald and Eddy performed a mock wedding ceremony at Lake Tahoe while filming Rose Marie. They considered that "by God's laws" they were married, although they were never able to do so legally. Every autumn, they returned to Lake Tahoe to renew their vows. As late as 1948, MacDonald's desk diary has a "Lake Tahoe" entry. After their 1943 visit, Eddy wrote a lengthy diary entry about their trip and his love for her, calling her "my wife," which he did in private to the end of her life.

Credits

Filmography

Discography

MacDonald performed and recorded more than 50 songs during her career, working exclusively for RCA Victor in the United States. She also did some early recordings for HMV in England and France while she was there on a concert tour in 1931. She earned three gold records, one for the LP album, Favorites in Stereo that she did with Nelson Eddy in 1959.

MacDonald in Song (1939)
Religious Songs (1945)
Operetta Favorites (1946)
Romantic Moments (1950)
Favorites (c. 1951)
Favorites in Stereo (1959)
Smilin' Through (1960)
Jeanette MacDonald Sings Songs of Faith and Inspiration (1963)

Concerts

Tours

Footnotes

Citations

References
Barclay, Florence L., The Rosary by Florence L. Barclay, new introduction by Sharon Rich, comments by Jeanette MacDonald and Nelson Eddy, Bell Harbour Press, 2005. This 1910 #1 best seller featured two singers in a "Jane Eyre" plot, and the heroine's nickname was Jeanette. Eddy chose it as a possible film vehicle for himself and MacDonald in 1948. This edition features a new introduction with excerpts from their written correspondence of 1948, in which the film project was discussed.
Castanza, Philip, The Films of Jeanette MacDonald and Nelson Eddy, Citadel Press, 1978.
Eddy, Nelson, "All Stars Don't Spangle" movie treatment for himself and MacDonald, reprinted in its entirety in Mac/Eddy Today magazine, issue #50.
Hamann, G.D. (Ed.), Collections of contemporary newspaper and magazine references in the following: Jeanette MacDonald in the 30s. (141 pp.), Jeanette MacDonald in the 40s (100 pp.), Nelson Eddy in the 30s and 40s (128 pp.), and Filming Today Press, 2005, Hollywood, California (www.GDHamann.com).
Knowles (Dugan), Eleanor, The Films of Jeanette MacDonald and Nelson Eddy, Booksurge Llc, 2006.
 Letters by MacDonald are reproduced and annotated. MacDonald dated Stone in 1927–28 and remained friends afterwards, so most of these are love letters. In one letter from August 1929 she tells Stone she is recovering from a heart attack.
 The complete, typewritten autobiography with MacDonald's handwritten editing, deletions and comments noted throughout. Annotated and with original letters from MacDonald's collaborator on the project.

 This is an updated edition of Rich, Sharon, Sweethearts: The Timeless Love Affair - On-screen and Off - Between Jeanette MacDonald and Nelson Eddy, Donald I. Fine, 1994. Footnotes are from 2001 edition. Updated again in 2014.
Skeel, Sharon. (2020) Catherine Littlefield: A Life in Dance. Oxford University Press.

External links

 
 
 
 

 
1903 births
1965 deaths
American film actresses
American musical theatre actresses
American operatic sopranos
American people of Scottish descent
Musicians from Philadelphia
Actresses from Philadelphia
Vaudeville performers
Burials at Forest Lawn Memorial Park (Glendale)
Metro-Goldwyn-Mayer contract players
20th-century American actresses
Paramount Pictures contract players
Singers from Pennsylvania
American people of Dutch descent
American people of English descent
California Republicans
Pennsylvania Republicans
RCA Victor artists
Texas Republicans
20th-century American women opera singers
Classical musicians from Pennsylvania
American Christian Scientists